The Barnsley Metrodome (Metrodome Leisure Complex) is a sports and leisure facility that was opened in 1989 by Neil Kinnock.

The facility is 5 minutes from the Barnsley Interchange and close to Junction 37 off the M1. It is located along Queens Road, Barnsley, South Yorkshire, in England. It is regularly home to major worldwide ten-pin bowling events, such as the Weber Cup and World Tenpin Masters.

The Metrodome played host to the 2006, 2007 and 2008 World Tenpin Masters and the Weber Cup.

The facility is home to Calypso Cove Waterpark, Metrodome Bowling and Fitness Flex Metrodome.

The facility also host events on the Professional Darts Corporation’s Pro Tour.

The facility is operated by BPL, a not-for-profit leisure trust established in 1999.

External links
Official Calypso Cove website
Official Metrodome Bowling website
Official Fitness Flex Metrodome website
Official BPL corporate website

Sports venues in South Yorkshire
Tenpin bowling alleys in the United Kingdom
Sport in Barnsley
Buildings and structures in Barnsley